Peter (1291 – 29 August 1315), called Tempesta (meaning "storm"), was the Count of Eboli from 1306. He was the eighth son of Charles II of Naples and Maria of Hungary (see Elizabeth of Sicily). His sobriquet came from his stormy temperament.

In 1309, he received Nocera and Isernia and exchanged Montescaglioso for Sorrento and Castellammare di Stabia. He began serving his brother, King Robert, against the Ghibellines of Uguccione della Faggiuola in Tuscany. He led 300 knights and was given the title of "Vicar of Tuscany, Lombardy, Romagna, the city of Bertinoro, and the city of Ferrara and Captain-General of the Guelph party of Tuscany".

He celebrated a jubilee at Siena and then moved on to Florence, where he stayed with the Mozzi family and the commune granted him a stipend of 4,000 florins. He took Arezzo on 29 September 1314, but Uguccione took Lucca. At Robert's request, Peter brought reinforcements north and met with initial successes. At the Battle of Montecatini, the his forces were defeated by Uguccione and the Ghibellines, and Peter was killed.

Ancestry

References

Sources
Ghisalberti, Alberto M. Dizionario Biografico degli Italiani: III Ammirato – Arcoleo. Rome, 1961.

1291 births
1315 deaths
Capetian House of Anjou
Counts of Italy